{{DISPLAYTITLE:C21H27NO4}}
The molecular formula C21H27NO4 (molar mass: 357.44 g/mol) may refer to:
 Laudanosine, a toxic metabolite of atracurium and cisatracurium that decreases the seizure threshold
 Nalbuphine, a synthetic opioid